Discula leacockiana is a species of small land snail, a terrestrial pulmonate gastropod mollusk in the family Geomitridae.

Distribution
This species occurs in Europe.

Conservation status
This species of snail is mentioned in annexes II and IV of the Habitats Directive.

References

Discula
Gastropods described in 1878